The 2003 Big South Conference football season was the second football season for the Big South Conference. The season began on Saturday, August 30, 2003 and concluded on November 22. The Gardner–Webb Runnin' Bulldogs won the conference's regular season championship, their second consecutive title.

Awards and honors

Conference honors
Offensive Player of the Year: Dre Barnes, Jr., RB, Liberty
Defensive Player of the Year: Mario Williams, Jr., FS, Gardner–Webb
Freshman of the Year: Jonna Lee, LB, Charleston Southern
Co-Scholar-Athlete of the Year: Jim Maxwell, Sr., LB, Gardner–Webb & Matt Sharpe, Sr., K, VMI
Coach of the Year: Steve Patton, Gardner–Webb

All-Conference Teams

Rankings

Regular season

All times Eastern time.

Week One

Week Two

Week Three

Week Four

Week Five

Week Six

Week Seven

Week Eight

Week Nine

Week Ten

Week Eleven

Week Twelve

Week Thirteen

Head coaches
Jay Mills, Charleston Southern
David Bennett, Coastal Carolina
Steve Patton, Gardner–Webb
Ken Karcher, Liberty
Cal McCombs, VMI

References